John Comyn, Earl of Angus jure uxoris, was a son of William Comyn, Lord of Badenoch later the Earl of Buchan and became the Earl of Angus, jure uxoris of his wife Matilda, heiress of Máel Coluim, Earl of Angus. He died in 1242.

Life
John was a son of William Comyn, Lord of Badenoch and his first wife Sarah Fitzhugh. Comyn became the Earl of Angus, jure uxoris of his wife Matilda, heiress of Máel Coluim, Earl of Angus. He died in 1242, in France, during King Henry III of England's expedition to Poitou. John died without issue.

Citations

References
Oram, Richard; "Alexander II: King of Scots 1214-1249", Birlinn, 2012. 
Young, Alan; "Robert the Bruce's Rivals: The Comyns, 1212-1314", Tuckwell Press, 1997, 9781862320536

Year of birth unknown
1242 deaths
13th-century mormaers
Earls of Angus
Peers jure uxoris